This list of notable companies manufacturing copper indium gallium selenide solar cells (CIGS) includes a number of companies, some of which have significantly reduced or completely closed down production:

 Ascent Solar Technologies
 Avancis (former subsidiary of Saint Gobain)
 Flisom (founded in 2005 as a spin-off company of ETH Zürich, Switzerland)
 Manz (turnkey CIGS fab)
 Miasolé
 Midsummer AB (Swedish manufacturer of CIGS solar modules and sputtering equipment for thin-film solar cells)
 Siva Power
 Solar Frontier (subsidiary of Showa Shell Sekiyu)
 Sunflare

Former companies or no longer produce CIGS modules
 IBM
 International Solar Electric Technology
 Global Solar Energy (module producer, US-based subsidiary of Hanergy)
 GSHK Solar (module producer, HK-based)
 Hanergy-Solibro (former subsidiary of Q-Cells)
 HelioVolt
 Nanosolar
 Odersun
 Soltecture (previously Sulfurcell)
 Solyndra
 Stion
 TSMC Solar (subsidiary of Taiwan Semiconductor Manufacturing)
 Veeco Instruments Inc

See also 

 :Category:Thin-film cell manufacturers
 Copper indium gallium selenide solar cells (CIGS technology)
 Copper indium gallium selenide (CIGS absorber material)
 List of photovoltaics companies
 Solar cell
 Thin film solar cell

References 

CIGS
Cigs
Cigs
Photovoltaics manufacturers
Renewable energy commercialization